Tarapur Vidya Mandir & Jr College is a high school in the Palghar-Tarapur area of the Palghar district, Maharashtra state, India. It has about 4500 students, and provides education from Kindergarten to Higher Secondary Certificate level. There is a center/ branch of the Indira Gandhi National Open University.
At present the Principal is Mrs. Joan Rosario.

Tarapur Vidya Mandir & Jr. College started in CIDCO colony with a single class, in MIDC Tarapur area now it is developed into a large school. It has experienced faculty.  Shri Ganapati Ambaji Lokseva Nidhi, a public charitable trust, was created and registered under registration Number E – 7319 (Mumbai). "Tarapur Vidya Mandir" is a grownup child of Shri Ganapati Ambaji Lokseva Nidhi, a Public Charitable Trust. A small Primary school with a few class rooms was started in 1980.

Every year one class was added to the school and it became a secondary school from the academic year 1986–87. However nobody had anticipated that in a matter of 5 years the school would grow to such an extent; become one of the leading English Medium School in the area of Boisar, Tal: Palghar, Dist: Palghar. Soon the institution has started a full-fledged Junior College, in the year initially in two faculties i.e. Science & Commerce. Now TVM is the  only leading English medium school in the area which provides highly specialized I.T. Education, facility along with other subject with both the faculties i.e. Science and Commerce.

TVM is the first school which has introduced a modern computerized system of academic education to the student from the JR.KG onwards. That is the reason Tarapur Vidya Mandir could produce 100% result both at S.S.C and H.S.C level at Mumbai Regional Educational Board. During its 31-year history, the school result of S.S.C. were 100% for 15 times and for H.S.C 5 times Our top ranks have always secures more than 90% to 95% marks during last many years. Every years 5 to 6 student scored 100% marks in the subject like Mathematics, Physics, Chemistry and Biology.

Famous Indian Cricket Shardul Thakur also studied in this school.

References

Schools in Maharashtra
Education in Palghar district
Junior colleges in Maharashtra